Ben More ("the great mountain") is a mountain in the Breadalbane region of the southern Scottish Highlands, near Crianlarich. There is no higher land in the British Isles south of Ben More. It is the highest peak in the Loch Lomond and The Trossachs National Park.

This patch frequently lasts until well into June and sometimes July. The similar name  appears as a summit near Lochnagar.

Climbing
The simplest ascent starts from Benmore Farm on the A85. Initially, one should follow the path leading up Benmore Burn, before leaving this path and heading up the northwest ridge of Ben More. The northeast ridge may prove a preferable alternative, being craggier and less steep.

Descent may be made from the col direct to Benmore Burn.

In the event of an incident, Killin Mountain Rescue Team are on duty.

A webcam located at the eastern edge of Crianlarich captures Ben More. It provides updates every 10 minutes. See http://www.benmorewebcam.co.uk

Air crashes
The two pilots and two passengers on board were killed in the accident. The Air Accidents Investigation Branch (AAIB) found that the aircraft struck Ben More whilst flying over snow-covered high terrain in marginal visual meteorological conditions and said that "Failure to maintain a safe altitude and insufficient attention to navigational procedures were contributory factors".

On 12 May 2012, two men were killed when their microlight aircraft crashed into the mountain at about 12:00 midday.

See also 
 List of Munro mountains
 Mountains and hills of Scotland

References

External links

 Ben More (Crianlarich) is at coordinates 
 Computer generated summit panorama (Index)
 Ben More - Crianlarich, map and large images

Munros
Marilyns of Scotland
Mountains and hills of the Southern Highlands
Mountains and hills of Stirling (council area)
1973 in Scotland
One-thousanders of Scotland
Aviation accidents and incidents locations in Scotland